James Gladden Freshour (August 15, 1876 – August 19, 1946) was an American medical doctor and a college football coach.

Freshour was born in Miami County, Ohio to civil war veteran and banker William Freshour and Emma (Shellenberger) Freshour.  He had one younger brother, William.

He graduated from Wittenberg University with a B. A. degree in 1898, and a M. D. degree at Miami Medical College, Cincinnati, in 1901, the same year his master's degree was conferred upon him at Wittenberg.  He married Elizabeth Rayner on November 26, 1902 in Piqua, Ohio. Freshour opened an office in Dayton, Ohio in 1902 and practiced medicine there until 1909.

He served as the head football coach at St. Mary's College—now known as the University of Dayton—for two seasons, leading the team to a record of 5–1 in 1906 an 0–4 in 1907.

In 1909 he accepted the position as physician and surgeon with the Rio Tinto Copper company, Terrasas, Mexico. He later accepted a similar position at Chihuahuas, Mexico, for LA Republica Mining company, and served on the staff of the Copper Queen Mining company at Bisbee, Arizona.

Elizabeth was granted a divorce in Reno, Nevada in 1911, citing his failure to provide for her despite a lavish lifestyle for himself. At the time of the divorce, she claimed to have not seen him since 1909, when he had taken the position in Mexico.

In World War I he served as a captain in the 148th Infantry. He was wounded in the Meuse-Argonne Offensive, received the Purple Heart and was cited for the French Medal of Honor and Crois de Guerre.

On May 12, 1925, he married Eva Gaskins Lee. He continued to practice medicine in Piqua after his return from World War I until his retirement in 1936, when he moved to Covington, Ohio.

He died August 19, 1946 from a heart ailment, and is buried in Forest Hill Cemetery, Piqua, Ohio.

Head coaching record

References

1876 births
1946 deaths
United States Army personnel of World War I
Dayton Flyers football coaches
People from Piqua, Ohio
Physicians from Ohio
University of Cincinnati College of Medicine alumni
United States Army officers
Wittenberg University alumni
People from Covington, Ohio